The Wharf Rat is a 1916 American silent comedy drama film directed by Chester Withey and starring Mae Marsh, Robert Harron, and Spottiswoode Aitken.

Cast

References

Bibliography
 Donald W. McCaffrey & Christopher P. Jacobs. Guide to the Silent Years of American Cinema. Greenwood Publishing, 1999.

External links
 

1916 films
1916 comedy films
American silent feature films
American black-and-white films
Films directed by Chester Withey
Triangle Film Corporation films
1910s English-language films
1910s American films
Silent American comedy films